Bourbonism can be a form of traditionalist conservatism, likely tied to French monarchism, or tourism focused on Bourbon whiskey production.  Specifically, Bourbonism may refer to:

Politics
 Supporters of the royal House of Bourbon:
 Ultra-royalist, supporters of the Bourbon Restoration
 Legitimists, adherents of the elder branch of the Bourbon dynasty
 Orléanist, adherents of the Orléans branch of the House of Bourbon
 Neo-Bourbonism, nostalgia for the Kingdom of the Two Sicilies
 Bourbon Democrat (1876–1904), a conservative or classical liberal member of the U.S. Democratic Party; initially used as a pejorative

Other uses
 Kentucky Bourbon Trail, a program sponsored by the Kentucky Distillers' Association, U.S.

See also 
 Bourbon (disambiguation)